Laurens Bakker  is the original drummer for the Dutch heavy metal band Picture.

Laurens, known as "Bakkie," started playing drums in various bands including Fase 5 and then John Ridge and Coccoon. In 1977, he met up with Rinus Vreugdenhil and with various musicians, started Picture. By 1979, Jan Bechtum and Ronald van Prooijen had joined the band for their first stable (and the classic) lineup. He remained with the band through their Eternal Dark album, but had to leave for personal reasons, as the gruel of touring, their bad luck with management, and having to support a family took a toll.

Laruens' influences included Carmine Appice, Vinnie Appice, John Bonham, Phil Rudd, and Cozy Powell. He used a Rogers Drums nine piece, double bass set and Paiste cymbals.

In late 2007, Laurens and the original members of Picture, with Ronald van Prooijen, teamed up for a reunion rehearsal. It went so well that they decided to continue rehearsing for some concert dates, and considered recording a new album in early 2008 with Shmoulik Avigal from the Diamond Dreamer lineup as their singer.

As of mid-2008, a permanent line-up was established with Laurens, Rinus Vreugdenhil, Jan Bechtum, Rob vanEnkhuizen, and Pete Lovell. A limited edition live album was recorded at various venues and was released by the band as Live 2008.  Plans were to go into the studio in early 2009 to record a new CD, Old Dogs, New Tricks.

References

External links
 Official website - Picture
 Biography van Picture in Dutch on popinstituut.nl
 Picture Yahoo Group

Dutch heavy metal drummers
Male drummers
Living people
Year of birth missing (living people)